The family Hyalocylidae is a taxonomic group of small floating sea snails, pelagic marine opisthobranch gastropod mollusks.

Genera
 Hyalocylis Fol, 1875
 † Praehyalocylis Korobkov, 1962 
Synonyms
 Hyalocylix P. Fischer, 1883: synonym of Hyalocylis Fol, 1875 (unjustified emendation)

References

 Rang, M., 1828. Notice sur quelques mollusques nouveaux appartenant à la classe des Ptéropodes et établissement et monographie du sous-genre Creseis. Annales des Sciences Naturelles 13: 302–319, pls17-18
Bohn, Scheltema & Holkema. Utrecht, 484 p.
 Janssen A.W. (2020). Notes on the systematics, morphology and biostratigraphy of holoplanktic Mollusca, 27. Comments on a paper discussing Pteropoda (Gastropoda, Heterobranchia) systematics, recently (2019) published in Bollettino Malacologico. Basteria. 84(1-3): 65–75.

Cavolinioidea
Gastropod families